Madhuban is a constituency of the Uttar Pradesh Legislative Assembly covering the city of Madhuban in the Mau district of Uttar Pradesh, India.

Madhuban is one of five assembly constituencies in the Ghosi Lok Sabha constituency. Since 2008, this assembly constituency is numbered 353 amongst 403 constituencies.

Election results

2022

2017
Bharatiya Janta Party candidate Dara Singh Chauhan won in last Assembly election of 2017 Uttar Pradesh Legislative Elections defeating Indian national congress candidate Amresh Chand by a margin of 29,415 votes.

Members of Legislative Assembly

References

External links
 

Assembly constituencies of Uttar Pradesh
Mau district